The Vagrancy Handicap is a Grade III American Thoroughbred horse race for fillies and mares that are three years old and older run over a distance of  furlongs on the dirt track held annually in late May or early June at Belmont Park in Elmont, New York.

History

The race is named in honor of Vagrancy, the Champion three-year-old filly and champion handicap mare of 1942 owned by Belair Stud and trained by Sunny Jim Fitzsimmons.

The event was inaugurated on 10 July 1948 at Aqueduct Racetrack in Queens, New York when Conniver easily won by five lengths over Harmonica in a time of 1:43 over a distance of  miles. Later that year Conniver was voted the 1948 American Champion Older Female Horse.

The event was idle from 1949 through 1951.

It was hosted by the Aqueduct track from inception through 1955 and again in 1960, 1963–1967, 1975, and 1977–1986. Over the years it has been contested at various distances:   miles in 1948 and 1952, 7 furlongs  between 1953–1997 and  furlongs from 1998 to today.

In 1955, the Vagrancy Handicap was run in two divisions. 

Between 1954 and 1960 the event was held in late summer.

The event was classified as a Grade III in 1973 and was upgraded to Grade II in 2002.
This race was downgraded to a Grade III for its 2014 running.

Records
Speed  record:
  furlongs: 1:14.46 –  Bear Fan  (2004) 
 7 furlongs: 1:20.80 –  Grecian Flight  (1988)

Margins:
 9 lengths –  Bear Fan  (2004)

Most wins:
 2 – Sky Beauty (1994, 1995)
 2 – Victim of Love (2020, 2021)

Most wins by a jockey:
 4 – Ángel Cordero Jr. (1977, 1984, 1987, 1989)
 4 – John Velazquez (1999, 2001, 2004, 2005)

Most wins by a trainer:
 5 – H. Allen Jerkens (1968, 1969, 1989, 1994, 1995)

Most wins by an owner:
 2 – Harry La Montagne (1948, 1957)
 2 – Ethel D. Jacobs (1955, 1965)
 2 – Calumet Farm (1956, 1961)
 2 – Meadow Stable (1955, 1963)
 2 – Wheatley Stable (1964, 1966)
 2 – Hobeau Farm (1968, 1969)
 2 – Eugene V. Klein (1986, 1987)
 2 – Georgia E. Hofmann (1994, 1995)
 2 –  Tommy Town Thoroughbred (2020, 2021)

Winners

Notes:

† In 1999, Hurricane Bertie finished first, but was disqualified and placed second; consequently, Gold Princess was placed first.

§ Ran as part of an entry

See also
 List of American and Canadian Graded races

References

Graded stakes races in the United States
Sprint category horse races for fillies and mares
Horse races in New York (state)
Recurring sporting events established in 1948
Belmont Park
1948 establishments in New York (state)
Grade 3 stakes races in the United States